Vidmantas Žiemelis (born December 4, 1950) is a Lithuanian politician.  In 1990 he was among those who signed the Act of the Re-Establishment of the State of Lithuania.

He also served at one point as Lithuania's Minister of Internal Affairs.

References

1950 births
Living people
Ministers of Internal Affairs of Lithuania
Lithuanian jurists
Members of the Seimas
21st-century Lithuanian politicians